John Wesley Fry (December 5, 1876 – December 23, 1946) was a politician in Alberta, Canada and a mayor of Edmonton.

Biography

Early life

John Fry was born in Woodstock, Ontario on December 5, 1876.  He grew up in Woodstock and Owen Sound and moved to Regina, Saskatchewan in 1897 to attend Normal School.  He received his teaching certificate and taught for three years in Gainsborough, Saskatchewan.  He married and moved to a homestead near Lloydminster.

In 1911, he moved to Edmonton and entered the contracting and real estate business.

Political career

John Wesley Fry sought office eleven times in his political career, and was never defeated.  His first attempt took place in the 1932 election, when he ran for the position of alderman on Edmonton City Council.  He was elected, finishing second of fifteen candidates.  He was re-elected in the 1934 and 1936 elections, finishing second each time (of eighteen and sixteen candidates, respectively).

Fry resigned midway through his third two-year term to run for mayor in the 1937 election, challenging incumbent Joseph Clarke.  He defeated Clarke by three thousand votes, and would go on to be re-elected in 1938 (defeating three challengers, including Clarke), 1939 (defeating local member of the Legislative Assembly of Alberta Samuel Barnes), 1940 (defeating two challengers), 1941 (defeating alderman George Campbell), 1942 (by acclamation), 1943 (defeating Thomas Cairns), and 1944 (defeating Rice Sheppard).  He did not seek re-election in the 1945 election, and did not seek political office again thereafter.

Personal life, death, and legacy

In addition to his political activities, John Wesley Fry was a member of the Kiwanis Club, the Masonic Lodge, the Union of Alberta Municipalities, and the Canadian Federation of Mayors and Municipalities (serving as President of the latter two).  He died December 23, 1946, survived by his wife, four daughters, and one son.

His eight years as mayor were the longest in Edmonton's history at that point.  William Hawrelak surpassed the record in 1963 (Hawrelak, who served three non-consecutive stints as mayor, would serve a total of more than nine years).  Fry's record of eight consecutive years as mayor stood until 2003, when Bill Smith surpassed it.

John Fry Park, a baseball park in Edmonton, is named in Fry's honour.

References
Edmonton Public Library Biography of John Fry
City of Edmonton biography of John Fry
Report to the Edmonton City Council Executive Committee including a list of aldermen who have been honoured in the names of Edmonton's features

1876 births
1946 deaths
Mayors of Edmonton
Canadian schoolteachers
People from Woodstock, Ontario
20th-century Canadian politicians